Langella is an Italian surname.

Anthony Langella (born 1974), French cyclist
Antonio Langella (born 1977), Italian footballer
Frank Langella (born 1938), Italian-American actor
Gennaro Langella (1939–2013), American mobster in the Colombo crime family

Italian-language surnames